is a Japanese game director and producer working for Square Enix. He is known as the director of Final Fantasy VI, Chrono Trigger, Final Fantasy VII, Final Fantasy VIII and Final Fantasy X, and the producer of the Final Fantasy X and Final Fantasy XIII series. Kitase is a vice president, a member of the board of directors and an executive officer at Square Enix. He is currently the head of Square Enix's Creative Business Unit I and the Final Fantasy series Brand Manager. He was the head of Square Enix's Business Division 1 during its entire existence as well as a Corporate Executive. He is also part of the Final Fantasy Committee that is tasked with keeping the franchise's releases and content consistent.

Biography
In July 1978, at the age of 11, Kitase watched the movie Star Wars for the first time and was deeply impressed with it. He later examined the making-of video to it and became interested in the creative process of the film industry. Kitase decided to attend the Nihon University College of Art and studied screenwriting and filmmaking. Although he enjoyed filming, he showed a much greater passion for post-production editing as he felt it allowed him to give the footage a completely new meaning and to appeal to the viewers' feelings. In his first year after the graduation, Kitase worked at a small animation studio that produced animated television programs and commercials. When he played Final Fantasy for the first time, he considered a switch to the game industry as he felt that it had potential when it came to animation and storytelling. Despite having no software development knowledge, he applied at the game development company Square and was hired in March 1990. In the ten years to follow, he gathered experience as an "event scripter", directing the characters' movements and facial expressions on the game screen as well as setting the timings and music transitions. He has compared this work to directing film actors. Kitase continued directing cutscenes in spite of filling other roles in later projects; for example, he directed part of the event scenes in Final Fantasy VIII and was event planner for the Nibelheim section of Crisis Core: Final Fantasy VII.

When many players responded to the sci-fi world of Final Fantasy VII and Final Fantasy VIII by requesting a "simple fantasy world", Kitase tried to expand the definition of the word "fantasy" beyond that of a medieval European setting. This led to Southeast Asia being the backdrop for Final Fantasy X. Kitase referred to Final Fantasy VII and its protagonist Cloud Strife as his favorite game and character, respectively. In an interview, he said that he loves first-person shooters. Kitase supervised the Final Fantasy VII: Technical Demo for PS3. Final Fantasy creator Hironobu Sakaguchi feels that he "handed the torch to" Kitase as far as heading the series is concerned.

Works

Video games

Other media

Additional credits

Notes
 Kitase was a producer on Final Fantasy XV until the end of 2013.

References

External links
Yoshinori Kitase's official English blog
 

1966 births
Living people
Japanese video game designers
Japanese video game producers
Japanese video game directors
Final Fantasy designers
Square Enix people